The 2017 Northern Ontario Scotties Tournament of Hearts, the Northern Ontario women's curling championship, was held January 18–24 at the Nipigon Curling and Event Centre in Nipigon, Ontario. The winning Krista McCarville rink represented Northern Ontario at the 2017 Scotties Tournament of Hearts in St. Catharines, Ontario. The win sent McCarville to her sixth national Scotties Tournament of Hearts.

For the third straight year, the final featured the McCarville rink from Thunder Bay against the Tracy Fleury rink from Sudbury. McCarville had won the Northern Ontario in 2016 as well, and went all the way to the finals of the 2016 Scotties Tournament of Hearts. Despite this, the Fleury team were the higher ranked rink going into the tournament. In the final, Team McCarville stole single points in the 4th and 5th points and then two points in the sixth end en route to winning the Northern Ontario championship.

The event was a double-round robin, from which the top two teams played in a final match for the championship.

Teams

Standings

Scores
The scores are as follows:

January 18
Draw 1
Fleury 14-5 Beaudry
McCarville 9-2 Mikkelson

January 19
Draw 2
McCarville 10-2 Beaudry
Fleury 9-2 Mikkelson
Draw 3
McCarville 7-10 Fleury
Mikkelson 7-8 Beaudry

January 20
Draw 4
Mikkelsen 4-8 McCarville
Beaudry 3-9 Fleury
Draw 5
Mikkelsen 3-9 Fleury
Beaudry 3-9 McCarville

January 21
McCarville 5-4 Fleury

Final
Saturday Jan.21 7:30 Pm

Notes

References

Curling in Northern Ontario
2017 Scotties Tournament of Hearts
Ontario Scotties Tournament of Hearts
2017 in Ontario
Sport in Thunder Bay District
January 2017 sports events in Canada